Shorea agamii is a species of plant in the family Dipterocarpaceae. The species is named after J. Agama a one time forest officier in the Sabah Forestry Department. Two subspecies are recognised subsp. agamii and subsp diminuta. The subspecies name diminuta is derived from Latin (diminutus = made small) and refers to the smaller leaves of this subspecies.

Shorea agamii is endemic to Borneo. It is an emergent tree, up to 50 m tall. It grows in mixed dipterocarp forest on well-drained sandy clay soils and clay-rich soils, up to 700 meters elevation. It is a light hardwood sold under the trade names of white meranti. The species is incorrectly listed in the IUCN redlist as Shorea agami. S. agamii subsp. agamii is found in at least three protected areas (Kabilli-Sepilok Forest Reserve, Lambir & Gunung Mulu National Parks), but is threatened elsewhere due to habitat loss.

References

agamii
Endemic flora of Borneo
Trees of Borneo
Taxobox binomials not recognized by IUCN 
Flora of the Borneo lowland rain forests